Bethel High School may refer to:

United States
Bethel High School (Connecticut), located in Bethel, Connecticut
Bethel High School (Ohio), located in Tipp City, Ohio
Bethel High School (Oklahoma), located in Shawnee, Oklahoma
Bethel High School (Virginia), located in Hampton, Virginia
Bethel High School (Washington), located in Spanaway, Washington
Bethel-Tate High School in Bethel, Ohio
Bethel Park High School in Bethel Park, Pennsylvania
Jesse M. Bethel High School in Vallejo, California
Bethel Regional High School in Bethel, Alaska

Hong Kong
Bethel High School (Hong Kong)

See also
Bethel Christian School (disambiguation) (many have high school divisions)
Bethel School (disambiguation)
Bethel (disambiguation)